The 1998 West Virginia Mountaineers football team represented West Virginia University in the 1998 NCAA Division I-A football season. It was the Mountaineers' 106th overall and 8th season as a member of the Big East Conference (Big East). The team was led by head coach Don Nehlen, in his 19th year, and played their home games at Mountaineer Field in Morgantown, West Virginia. They finished the season with a record of eight wins and four losses (8–4 overall, 5–2 in the Big East) and with a loss against Missouri in the Insight.com Bowl.

Schedule

Rankings

Personnel

References

West Virginia
West Virginia Mountaineers football seasons
West Virginia Mountaineers football